Keana is a Local Government Area in Nasarawa State, Nigeria. Its headquarters are in the town of Keana.

It has an area of 1,048.1 km and a population of about 80,000 (according to the 2006 census).

It is home to Federal Government Girls College, Keana.

The postal code of the area is 951.

References

Local Government Areas in Nasarawa State